Tiha Bârgăului is a commune in Bistrița-Năsăud County, Transylvania, Romania. It is composed of five villages: Ciosa (Csószahegy), Mureșenii Bârgăului (Marosborgó), Piatra Fântânele (Báránykő), Tiha Bârgăului and Tureac (Turjágó).

References

Communes in Bistrița-Năsăud County
Localities in Transylvania